The Faculty of Informatics and Statistics (FIS VŠE), also known as the School of Informatics and Statistics, is the fourth of six faculties at Prague University of Economics and Business. The faculty was established in 1991, following the dissolution of the Faculty of Direction. Its academic focus is informatics, statistics, econometrics and other mathematical methods applied to business practice. The faculty has eight departments and several research laboratories, and hosts around 2,500 students across its programs.

Departments 
Departments of the faculty include:

 Department of Demography (KDEM)
 Department of Econometrics (KEKO)
 Department of Economic Statistics (KEST)
 Department of Information and Knowledge Engineering (KIZI)
 Department of Information Technologies (KIT) Research activities of the department focus on methodologies for development, operation and management of information systems.
 Department of Mathematics (KMAT)
 Department of Multimedia (KME)
 Department of Statistics and Probability (KSTP)
 Department of Systems Analysis (KSA), focusing on the application of principles of systems methodology and systems thinking into the fields of information systems, and business and management. Its main areas of research interest include: implementation of information systems within an organization, information management, strategic planning and business reengineering.

Academics 

The faculty offers Bachelor, Master and doctoral study programs.

Bachelor programs 
Bachelor study programs are 3-3,5 years in length and conclude with a Bachelor State Examination and defence of a Bachelor thesis. Bachelor theses usually focus on practical topics.

 Applied Informatics
 Information Media and Services
 Mathematical Methods in Economics, a program focusing on quantitative methods, and the inter-related fields of economics, business economics and mathematical methods.
 Multimedia in Economic Practice
 Socio-economic demography, a study program focused mainly on reproduction of human resources and human capital, covering topics from demography to social and economic policy.
 Statistical Methods in Economics, a program focusing on applying statistical methods to real economics.
 Statistics and Econometrics, a course focusing on statistics, various methods bordering economics and mathematics, econometric and mathematical modelling and informatics.

Master programs 

Masters programs end with a Final State Examination and defence of a thesis. Available subjects are divided into Major and Minor:

Doctoral programs 

Doctoral programs are usually at least three years long and conclude with the defence of a PhD thesis. Programs offered include Informatics, Econometrics and Operations Research, and Statistics.

Academic cooperation 
The faculty cooperates with several academic and non-academic institutions, including Czech Technical University in Prague, Academy of Sciences of the Czech Republic, Czech Statistical Office, and a number of foreign universities.

Gallery

References

External links 
 Faculty of Informatics and Statistics website
 University of Economics website

Educational institutions in Prague
Educational institutions established in 1991
Schools of mathematics
1991 establishments in the Czech Republic
Žižkov